The 1901 Swarthmore Quakers football team was an American football team that represented Swarthmore College as an independent during the 1901 college football season. The team compiled an 8–2–2 record and outscored opponents by a total of 148 to 89. George H. Brooke was the head coach.

Schedule

References

Swarthmore
Swarthmore Garnet Tide football seasons
Swarthmore Quakers football